Brocklesby railway station was a station near Brocklesby, Lincolnshire.  It was formally closed by British Rail on 3 October 1993.

The station was located to suit the Earl of Yarborough, in his capacity as chairman of the Manchester Sheffield and Lincolnshire Railway who built the line. It included a private waiting room for the Earl.  The building was designed by architects Weightman and Hadfield in the Tudor Gothic style used  throughout the line.  The building is listed as grade II, in which the style is referred to as Jacobean.

The unusual platform-based signal box is also a grade II Listed building and became redundant due to resignalling works in December 2015.

On 27 March 1907, two freight trains collided at Brocklesby.

References

External links

Disused railway stations in the Borough of North Lincolnshire
Railway stations in Great Britain opened in 1848
Railway stations in Great Britain closed in 1993
Former Great Central Railway stations
Grade II listed buildings in Lincolnshire